The Ace Magic is an Indian ultralight trike, designed by John Penry-Evans and produced by Ace Aviation of Tamil Nadu. The aircraft is supplied as a complete ready-to-fly-aircraft.

Design and development
It also complies with the US FAR 103 Ultralight Vehicles rules when equipped with a  fuel tank.

The Magic features a cable-braced hang glider-style high wing, weight-shift controls, a single-seat open cockpit, tricycle landing gear and a single engine in pusher configuration.

Designed in the United Kingdom and produced in India, the aircraft is imported into the UK by P&M Aviation.

The aircraft is made from bolted-together aluminum tubing, with its two-surface wing covered in Dacron sailcloth. Its  wingspan is supported by a single tube-type kingpost and uses an "A" frame weight-shift control bar. The powerplant is a twin-cylinder, air-cooled, two-stroke, single-ignition,  Rotax 447 engine. Optional engines include the  Simonini Victor 1 Plus and the four-stroke NS.T NS650. A trim system, adjustable leg length and  panniers are all standard equipment.

A number of different wings can be fitted to the basic carriage, including the high performance Cyclone, the sport 90% double surface Laser, the intermediate Touch and the beginner Spirit.

Specifications (Magic Cyclone)

References

External links

Ace Magic
2000s Indian sport aircraft
2000s Indian ultralight aircraft
Single-engined pusher aircraft
Ultralight trikes